Events from the year 1796 in Ireland.

Incumbent
Monarch: George III

Events
1 February – Wolfe Tone arrives in France.
12 July – first Orange Institution parades on The Twelfth held to commemorate the Battle of the Boyne (1690) in Portadown, Lurgan and Waringstown.
9 August – the convict ship Marquis Cornwallis leaves Cork for Australia.
September – 'Gold rush' in the Wicklow Hills near Avoca.
10 December – the convict ship Britannia leaves Cork for Australia.
15 December – Expédition d'Irlande: French expedition (43 ships and 14,000 men) sails from Brest.
22 December – French fleet, with Wolfe Tone on board, arrives in Bantry Bay, but is unable to land due to contrary winds.
Insurrection Act and Treason by Women Act passed.
Yeomanry Corps formed.
Building of the Four Courts in Dublin is substantially completed under the supervision of James Gandon.

Arts and literature
Edward Bunting's A General Collection of the Ancient Irish Music is published.

Births
27 March – Robert James Graves, surgeon (died 1853).
April – Abraham Brewster, judge and Lord Chancellor of Ireland (died 1874).
20 July – Maziere Brady, judge and Lord Chancellor of Ireland (died 1871).
16 August – Francis Crozier, British Royal Navy officer and polar explorer (lost after 1848).
4 October – Robert King, 4th Earl of Kingston, soldier and politician (died 1867).
27 November
John MacEnery, priest and pioneer archaeologist (died 1841).
Richard Mayne, barrister and joint first Commissioner of Police of the Metropolis, head of the London Metropolitan Police (1829–1868) (died 1868).
3 December – Francis Kenrick, headed the Roman Catholic Archdiocese of Philadelphia, then was Archbishop of Baltimore (died 1863).
Full date unknown
Michael Banim, writer (died 1874).
James Curley, astronomer (died 1889 in the United States).
George Crawford Hyndman, auctioneer and marine biologist (died 1867).
Eliza Hamilton Dunlop, poet (died 1880 in Australia).
Charles Cromwell Ingham, painter and founder of the New York National Academy of Design (died 1863 in the United States).
John Pitt Kennedy, British military engineer, agricultural reformer and civil servant (died 1879).
James McLevy, detective in Edinburgh (died 1875 in Scotland).
George Maguire, Mayor of St. Louis, Missouri (died 1882 in the United States).
Jones Quain, anatomist (died 1865).
Michael Joseph Quin, author, journalist and editor (died 1843).

Deaths
23 May – John Roberts, architect. (born 1712/14)
William Henn, judge (born c.1720).
Bowen Southwell, landowner and politician (born 1713).

References

 

 
Years of the 18th century in Ireland
Ireland
1790s in Ireland